Jernej Kolenko (born November 30 1982) is a former Slovenian motorcycle speedway rider who rode in Speedway World Cup.

Career
Kolenko medalled six times at the Slovenian Individual Speedway Championship. Although he won 2 silver medals and 4 bronze medals he never became champion of Slovenia, being denied the gold medal twice by Matej Žagar.

He signed for King's Lynn Stars for the 2002 Elite League speedway season and reached the final of the 2002 Speedway Under-21 World Championship. The following year, he joined Oxford Silver Machine for the 2003 Elite League speedway season. He returned to British speedway in 2005 after joining the Exeter Falcons.

Speedway Grand Prix results

See also 
 Slovenia national speedway team

References 

1982 births
Living people
Slovenian speedway riders